Gay Science: The Ethics of Sexual Orientation Research is a 1997 book by the philosopher Timothy F. Murphy about scientific research on sexual orientation.

The book received both positive reviews and mixed assessments. Reviewers credited Murphy with providing a useful discussion of the ethical implications of sexual orientation research, including the work of scientists such as the neuroscientist Simon LeVay and the geneticist Dean Hamer, and with convincingly criticizing the philosopher John Finnis. However, his style of writing was criticized.

Summary

Murphy, a philosopher, discusses scientific research on sexual orientation, including homosexuality, heterosexuality, and bisexuality. He aims to provide "an ethical overview of sexual orientation research and, more specifically, the meaning of that research for gay people." He argues in favor of the use of the terms "homoeroticism" and "heteroeroticism" in place of "homosexuality" and "heterosexuality" respectively, considering the latter set of terms misleading. He discusses conversion therapy. He also discusses the work of Sigmund Freud, the founder of psychoanalysis, including Freud's views on homosexuality. He evaluates the work and views of scientists such as the neuroscientist Simon LeVay, the geneticist Dean Hamer, and J. A. Y. Hall, as well as the work of the psychoanalysts Irving Bieber and Charles Socarides, the psychologists Alan P. Bell, J. Michael Bailey, Doreen Kimura, and Joseph Nicolosi, and the sociologist Martin S. Weinberg. He also discusses and criticizes the views on homosexuality of the philosophers Michel Foucault, John Finnis, and Michael Levin.

Publication history
Gay Science was first published by Columbia University Press in 1997.

Reception

Mainstream media
Gay Science received positive reviews from James Edward Van Buskirk in Library Journal and R. W. Smith in Choice and a mixed review from the biologist Ruth Hubbard in The Times Literary Supplement. The book was also reviewed by the gay writer Gabriel Rotello in New Scientist.

Van Buskirk described the book as an "important addition to the field" and a useful complement to LeVay's Queer Science (1996). He credited Murphy with providing an objective account of sexual orientation research and its ethical implications. Smith credited Murphy with providing a "carefully detailed" and "meticulously logical" analysis of the moral implications of research into the causes of homosexuality. However, he also described the book as "somewhat repetitious".

Hubbard credited Murphy with addressing "a range of interesting questions about the purpose and uses of scientific research" into homosexuality, but criticized his writing, calling it "convoluted and ponderous". She also criticized him for writing "as though ethics and moral philosophy exist outside politics", arguing that "the power relationships that determine what science gets done also circumscribe the extent to which it is done ethically" and that if "scientific inquiring takes place in a context in which its results are certain to be misused, then the ethical innocence it may have in other contexts becomes irrelevant".

Gay media
Gay Science received a positive review from the psychiatrist Vernon Rosario in The Harvard Gay & Lesbian Review. Rosario described the book as a "welcome addition to the debate" on biological research on homosexuality, and credited Murphy with providing "a scientifically well-informed and balanced review of the recent research and its possible ethical implications" and with being "well-versed in the basic science and cognizant of the enormous theoretical and methodological impediments to doing sound research in this area." He agreed with him that it is reasonable to hypothesize that homosexuality might have a biological basis, but considered him overly optimistic in believing that research into that possibility would benefit gay people. He commented that, "it seems unlikely that biological research on homosexuality will easily shake off its 150-year-old association with the pathologization of same-sex love", and noted that all of the sexual orientation research Murphy discussed was actually concerned specifically with homosexuality. He wrote that while Murphy discussed hypothetical scenarios in which it became possible for scientists to manipulate "sexual orientation in utero or in adults", his "countless scenarios seem contrived and belabored". He described Murphy's view that adults should be free to have their sexual orientation changed through biological manipulation and that "mothers would have the right to abort fetuses that tested positive for homosexuality", if either of these things ever became possible, as "disturbing", but also difficult to argue against.

Scientific and academic journals
Gay Science received positive reviews from the psychiatrist Susan Bradley in The New England Journal of Medicine, the philosopher David Hull in The Quarterly Review of Biology, the philosopher Sandra Harding in the Journal of Homosexuality, Mark Chekola in Bioethics, and the philosopher Michael Ruse in the British Journal for the Philosophy of Science. The book received mixed reviews from the philosopher Udo Schüklenk in JAMA, Daniel Wolfe in Culture, Health & Sexuality, the sex researcher James D. Weinrich in Human Biology, and the feminist studies scholar Martha McCaughey in Science, Technology, & Human Values.

Bradley described Gay Science as a "wonderful book". She found Murphy's arguments convincing, but suggested that they might not convince gay or lesbian readers. She described him as "courageous" for arguing that the possibility that future treatments for homoeroticism might result in a reduction in the number of gay people is not a serious problem. She concluded that although Murphy's arguments were sometimes repetitive and tedious, his points are well made and valuable. Hull praised Murphy's discussion of the moral and social issues raised by scientific research on human sexuality. He agreed with Murphy that if a method to select a child's future sexual orientation were developed it would result in a reduction of the number of gay people. Harding described the book as, "a careful, illuminating, balanced, and thought-provoking analysis not only of the ethics of sexual orientation research, but also of its science and politics." She credited Murphy with providing a, "complex, empirically sound, and carefully modest constructionist account of sexual orientation". She found Murphy's discussion of the ethical issues involved in sexual orientation therapies, and the use of sexual orientation tests, thoughtful and careful.

Chekola described the book as "an admirable exploration of issues related to research on sexual orientation and possible applications of such research". He credited Murphy with being the first person to write a comprehensive work examining these issues, calling him "extremely thorough and exhaustive". He also credited Murphy with carefully discussing the limitations of research by LeVay, Bailey, Hamer, Hall, Kimura, and Nicolosi. He wrote that while Murphy's speculation that science might develop means of preventing or altering homosexuality, and that the number of gay people would be diminished as a result, might seem "odd and chilling", it was "an interesting exercise in looking at the implications scientific knowledge might have for people's choices that could result in a minority's becoming smaller, a concern not limited to gay and lesbian people." However, he also wrote that Murphy's thoroughness would probably limit his audience to academics, and that "Many undergraduates would likely get lost at various points in the book."

Ruse credited Murphy with having "a deep and sensitive knowledge of the appropriate areas of science", being "able to write clearly and distinctly about difficult issues, so that one can follow without any trouble the sorts of points that he wants to make", and providing good discussions of the work of researchers such as LeVay. He wrote that the book made his own work Homosexuality: A Philosophical Inquiry (1988) outdated. He agreed with Murphy's defense of inquiry into the origins of sexual orientation. He found Murphy's discussion of attempts by parents to control the sexual orientation of their children interesting, but disputed Murphy's conclusion that parents would have the right to engage in such attempts, arguing that rather than granting them that right it would be better "to change societal attitudes about homosexuality so that people do not show prejudice against homosexuals." He found Murphy's discussion of laws about homosexuality interesting, but questioned whether Murphy provided "anything which is deeply grounded in a well thought-out philosophy of law". He also questioned whether Murphy was right to devote attention to the issue of whether it is possible or desirable to change a person's sexual orientation and noted that, "Murphy seems to have virtually no time or interest in Freud's work, even though a mere twenty years ago the Freudian etiological analysis of homosexuality was considered really significant." He also observed that Murphy had little or no interest in discussing social constructionist views influenced by Foucault.

Schüklenk considered the book similar to Hamer's The Science of Desire (1994), as well as to Queer Science, though she found it a superior work. She praised Murphy's use of thought experiments and complimented his overview of scientific accounts of sexual orientation. She also agreed with him that a strong case can be made against biological research on sexual orientation because of its potential misuses. However, she criticized his discussion of the use of methods that might potentially predict a child's future sexual orientation, arguing that he did not take cultural differences between countries into account. She criticized Murphy for devoting insufficient attention to issues affecting the welfare of gay people outside the United States. However, she considered him correct to maintain that a test for a genetically-based homosexuality would not necessarily be used in ways that would harm gay people, and agreed with him that biological findings on homosexuality has no relevance to the issue of the moral status of homosexual behavior.

Wolfe described the book as "invaluable for students of gay history, medicine and their intersections", and praised its, "Careful summary and careful citations". He complimented Ruse for his discussions of the research of Bieber, Socarides, Hamer, and LeVay, his account of conversion therapy, and his philosophical discussion of the ethical questions involved in scientific research on sexual orientation, including the possible development of methods to prevent or alter homosexuality. He also credited Murphy with exposing the oversimplification of research such as that of LeVay by the media. Though noting that not all readers would find Murphy's ethical discussions interesting, he agreed with Murphy's criticisms of Finnis's views, while finding them obvious. He criticized Murphy for devoting too much space to discussing anti-gay views and arguments.

Weinrich credited Murphy with providing a "reasonably up-to-date review" of scientific accounts of sexual orientation, and endorsed Murphy's criticisms of Finnis, calling them "complete and devastating". He also praised Murphy for helpfully addressing "questions about the supposed naturalness or unnaturalness of homosexual desire and behavior" and for his discussion of "the consequences for society of his lines of thought." However, he described much of Murphy's discussion of the question of whether research into sexual orientation should be undertaken at all as boring, and wrote that most of Murphy's conclusions ranged "from self-evident to uninteresting." He also accused Murphy of being naive in his discussion of how institutions such as the Catholic Church and the American military might respond to the development of scientific methods of preventing or detecting homosexuality, and argued that he was overly critical of sociobiological explanations of homosexuality, and sometimes showed a "less than perfect" understanding of biology.

McCaughey credited Murphy with providing interesting discussions of the therapeutic treatment of homosexuality, parental control of sexual orientation in children, testing for sexual orientation, and the limits of the use of the concept of nature in moral and legal arguments. However, she criticized him for ignoring "the arguments and research suggesting that the divide between homo and hetero and its presumed natural origin accounts for much bigotry, discrimination, and violence against gay people." She also noted that he ignored the fact that "most of the 1990s sexual-orientation research centers on men" and that he did not challenge the "fundamental sexism of the idea that gay men are similar to women".

See also
 Biology and sexual orientation
 Environment and sexual orientation

References

Bibliography
Books

 

Journals

 
  
 
  
 
 
  
  
  
 
  
  
  
  

1990s LGBT literature
1997 non-fiction books
American non-fiction books
Books about the philosophy of sexuality
Columbia University Press books
Contemporary philosophical literature
English-language books
Non-fiction books about same-sex sexuality